The 1971 Georgia 500 was a NASCAR Winston Cup Series racing event that occurred on November 7, 1971, at Middle Georgia Raceway in Byron, Georgia.

The race car drivers still had to commute to the races using the same stock cars that competed in a typical weekend's race through a policy of homologation (and under their own power). This policy was in effect until roughly 1975. By 1980, NASCAR had completely stopped tracking the year model of all the vehicles and most teams did not take stock cars to the track under their own power anymore.

Race report
Friday Hassler, Bobby Allison, Jim Paschal, and Tiny Lund would fight for the first-place position in this race; with Allison leading the most laps. Bobby Allison would go on to defeat Tiny Lund by a margin of one lap after more than three hours and twenty minutes of racing. Bill Dennis's last-place finish would occur on the first lap in this 500-lap regulation event due to problems with his driveshaft. Friday Hassler had a great run, leading 12 laps early on the way to a third-place finish.

This was a combination race with the Grand American series. Tiny Lund was the best finishing pony car in 2nd, 1 lap down in his Camaro. The other Grand Am drivers were Ernie Shaw, Frank Sessions, Wayne Andrews, Joe Dean Huss, Buck Baker, Randy Hutchinson, H.B. Bailey, Jim Paschal, Bob Williams, & David Ray Boggs.

There were 32 drivers on the grid; all of them were born in the United States of America. NASCAR officials gave out seven caution flags for 44 laps; one of them was related to the Walter Ballard crash on lap 455.

Vic Ballard and Junie Donlavey were the most notable crew chiefs to actively participate in this race.

Engine problems would retire some drivers out of the race in addition to clutch problems and troubles with managing the transmission, the suspension, and the alternator. Manufacturers that are hard to find today like the AMC Javelin, the Pontiac Firebird, and the Camaro once competed alongside "plain Jane" Chevrolet, Ford, and Dodge vehicles.

Jimmy Watson would never compete in a NASCAR Cup Series race after this event while Bob Williams would make his introduction into professional stock car racing here. Individual winnings for this event ranged from a handsome $3,275 ($ when considering inflation) to a meager $350 ($ when considering inflation).

Until the Pontiac Excitement 400 in 1989, this marked the last time that Richard Petty failed to make the starting grid of a Cup race.

Qualifying

Finishing order

 Bobby Allison
 Tiny Lund
 Friday Hassler
 Neil Castles
 Bill Champion
 Earl Brooks
 J.D. McDuffie
 Ernie Shaw
 Frank Sessoms
 Frank Warren
 Jabe Thomas
 Walter Ballard
 Wayne Andrews
 Wendell Scott
 David Sisco
 Joe Dean Huss
 John Sears
 Buck Baker
 Randy Hutchison
 Dick Brooks
 Ed Negre
 H.B. Bailey
 G.C. Spencer
 Jim Paschal
 Bill Seifert
 Bob Williams
 Henley Gray
 David Ray Boggs
 Dub Simpson
 Earle Canavan
 Jimmy Watson
 Bill Dennis

References

Georgia 500
Georgia 500
NASCAR races at Middle Georgia Raceway